Anatoly Nikolayevich Yarkin (born 11 November 1958) is a retired Soviet cyclist. He was part of the Soviet team that won the time trial event at the 1980 Summer Olympics. Individually, he finished in sixth place in the road race, helping Sergei Sukhoruchenkov and Yuri Barinov to win the race. Next year, he won a silver medal in the team time trial at the 1981 UCI Road World Championships.

He retired from the Soviet team in 1984, but a few years later competed for a club in Chile. After that he worked as a cycling coach in Samara and later as a popularizer of mountain biking in Tolyatti.

References

1958 births
Living people
Soviet male cyclists
Olympic cyclists of the Soviet Union
Cyclists at the 1980 Summer Olympics
Olympic medalists in cycling
Olympic gold medalists for the Soviet Union
Medalists at the 1980 Summer Olympics
People from Zaporizhzhia Oblast